Ericaceous may refer to:
 Ericaceae, the heather family
 Calcifuges, all plants which dislike alkaline (chalky) soil – including heathers, rhododendron and camellia
 Ericaceous bed, a bed with acidic soil typically having a pH between 4.5 and 6 used for growing Calcifuges